Euryphagus is a genus of longhorn beetles native to tropical Asia. It is classified in the family Cerambycidae, subfamily Cerambycinae, and the tribe Trachyderini. The generic name is derived from Greek εὐρύς ("wide") and φαγεῖν ("to eat") referring to the broad mandibles of the males.

Species
Euryphagus includes the following species, along with their synonyms and distribution ranges:

Euryphagus lundii (Fabricius, 1793) - found throughout tropical Asia
= Euryphagus nigripes  (Olivier) Pascoe, 1866
Euryphagus miniatus (Fairmaire, 1904) - found in southern China and Indochina
= Euryphagus chinensis Gressitt, 1939
Euryphagus maxillosus (Olivier, 1795) -	Borneo, Sumatra, Java, Laos, Myanmar, Malaya, Philippines
= Euryphagus pictus (Voet, 1778) (permanently unavailable)
Euryphagus quadrimacula (Voet, 1806) (permanently unavailable)
Euryphagus bipunctatus (Schoenherr, 1817)
Euryphagus nigricollis (Heller, 1913)
Euryphagus ustulatus Achard, 1912  - found in Borneo
Euryphagus variabilis (Pascoe, 1860) - found in the Maluku Islands

References

Trachyderini
Cerambycidae genera